George Edward Hams (29 July 1928 – 2 February 2023) was an Australian rules footballer who played for Collingwood in the Victorian Football League (VFL).

Hams was at Collingwood during a strong period for the club and participated in ten finals matches. Two of those were Grand Finals, back to back in 1952 and 1953, with the latter resulting in a premiership. He was seen mostly in the back pocket and retired in 1956 to pursue an engineering career.

Hams died on 2 February 2023, at the age of 94.

References

External links

1928 births
2023 deaths
Australian rules footballers from Victoria (Australia)
Collingwood Football Club players
Collingwood Football Club Premiership players
Ivanhoe Amateurs Football Club players
One-time VFL/AFL Premiership players